= Seh Rah-e Gahraz =

- Location in Iran
- Coordinates: 37°22′15″N 48°21′08″E
- Country: Iran
- Province: Ardabil Province
- Time zone: UTC+3:30 (IRST)
  - Summer (DST): UTC+4:30 (IRDT)

Seh Rah-e Gahraz is a village in the Ardabil Province of Iran.
